Mary Hill Burton (1819-1909) was a Scottish social and educational reformer and the first woman governor of Heriot-Watt College.

Biography
Mary Burton was born in Aberdeen but moved to Edinburgh in 1832 with her widowed mother and her brother, the lawyer and historian John Hill Burton.

A single woman, with an independent income from rental properties, she was a supporter of the Edinburgh National Society for Women's Suffrage and an advocate for improving access to education for women and working people. In 1868, she went to court, unsuccessfully, for the right to register to vote.

Mary Burton successfully campaigned for the Watt Institution to admit women students on equal terms to men in 1869, twenty-three years before legislation required Scottish universities to do so. Her niece Ella Burton was one of the early women students to benefit.

Mary Burton was one of the first women elected to serve on Parochial and School Boards and became the first woman on the School's Board of Directors and later the first woman governor of Heriot-Watt College and Honorary President of the Watt Literary Association.

She purchased Liberton Bank House on Gilmerton Road, Edinburgh, in 1844 and lived there until 1898. Arthur Conan Doyle, a family friend, lodged there while a student at Newington Academy in the 1860s.

She died in 1909 in Aberdeen and is buried in Dean Cemetery, Edinburgh. In her will she left "£100 to provide prizes for 'deserving students irrespective of age or sex' attending evening classes at Heriot-Watt College and £100 to the Edinburgh Women's Suffrage Society to campaign 'for the admission of women to sit as members of parliament, either at Westminster or in a Scottish Parliament'".

Legacy
Heriot-Watt University has honoured Mary Burton with a fund for female students studying STEM subjects launched in 2019 on the 200th anniversary of her birth. The Mary Burton building on the university's main Riccarton campus is named after her. There is a blue plaque in her honour.

References

1819 births
1909 deaths
People associated with Heriot-Watt University
Scottish suffragists
Burials at the Dean Cemetery
People from Aberdeen